Mower County is a county in the U.S. state of Minnesota. As of the 2020 census, the population was 40,029. The county seat is Austin. Mower County comprises the Austin Micropolitan Statistical Area and is included in the Rochester-Austin Combined Statistical Area. Lake Louise State Park is in southeastern Mower County, near Le Roy.

History
The federal government established Wisconsin Territory effective July 3, 1836, and included what is now Minnesota, until its eastern portion was granted statehood (as Wisconsin) in 1848.

Congress established the Minnesota Territory effective March 3, 1849. The newly organized territorial legislature created nine counties across the territory in October of that year. Two of the original counties, Dakota and Wabashaw (later Wabasha), had portions reassigned on March 5, 1853, to create Rice County.

In 1852, Jacob McQuillin's family settled in southern Rice County, beginning a settlement movement that rapidly grew. On February 20, 1855, the territorial legislature created the present county from the southernmost part of Rice County. The new county was named for John Edward Mower, a member of the territorial legislature.

On March 1, 1856, Territorial Governor Willis A. Gorman signed the legislative act that organized the county. He appointed three commissioners, who first met in Frankford Township. In January 1857 those commissioners designated the permanent seat in Austin Township. In July 1857 the location within Austin Township was further defined, within Austin village, which had been platted during the spring of 1856.

Geography

Mower County lies on Minnesota's border with Iowa. The Cedar River flows south through the western part of the county, into Mitchell County, Iowa. The Upper Iowa River rises in Mower County. Its branches, the Little Iowa and Upper Branch Upper Iowa, merge near Le Roy and flow east-southeast out of the county's southeast corner into Mitchell County, Iowa. Deer Creek drains the southeastern part of the county, flowing northeast into Fillmore County. Bear Creek drains the northern part of the county, flowing east into Fillmore County. Carey Creek drains the northeastern part of the county, flowing northeast into Olmsted County. The county terrain consists of low rolling hills, etched with drainages and gullies. The area is devoted to agriculture where possible. The terrain slopes to the east and south from an elevated center ridge running west–east, with its highest point 1.6 mile (2.6 km) east of Elkton, at 1,440' (439m) ASL.

Lakes
One of only four counties in Minnesota without any natural lakes (along with Olmsted, Pipestone, and Rock), Mower County does have four small ponds and lakes created by dams:
East Side Lake: in the northeast quadrant of Austin
Lake Louise: in Lake Louise State Park near Le Roy
Mill Pond: in downtown Austin near the Hormel plant
Ramsey Mill Pond: in Ramsey Golf Course, near the unincorporated settlement of Ramsey
The Cedar River (sometimes called the Red Cedar River) flows south into the county from its source in Dodge County and continues through the county into Mitchell County, Iowa. It flows through Mower County's four westernmost townships: Udolpho, Lansing, Austin, and Lyle.

Major highways

 
 
 
 
  Minnesota State Highway 16
  Minnesota State Highway 56
  Minnesota State Highway 105
  Minnesota State Highway 251

Airports
 Austin Municipal Airport (AUM) - east of Austin

Adjacent counties

 Dodge County - north
 Olmsted County - northeast
 Fillmore County - east
 Howard County, Iowa - southeast
 Mitchell County, Iowa - south
 Worth County, Iowa - southwest
 Freeborn County - west
 Steele County - northwest

Protected areas

 Lake Louise State Park
 Larson State Wildlife Management Area
 Red Cedar State Wildlife Management Area
 Rose State Wildlife Management Area

Demographics

2000 census

The county population has declined since its peak in 1960, as younger people have moved to urban areas for economic opportunities.

As of the 2000 census, there were 38,603 people, 15,582 households, and 10,315 families in the county. The population density was 54.3/sqmi (21.0/km2). There were 16,251 housing units at an average density of 22.9/sqmi (8.82/km2). The racial makeup of the county was 94.7% White, 0.6% Black or African American, 0.2% Native American, 1.5% Asian, <0.1% Pacific Islander, 2.2% from other races, and 0.9% from two or more races.  4.3% of the population were Hispanic or Latino of any race. 35.9% identified as being of German, 24.4% as Norwegian and 7.0% as of Irish ancestry.

There were 15,582 households, out of which 29.70% had children under the age of 18 living with them, 54.70% were married couples living together, 8.00% had a female householder with no husband present, and 33.80% were non-families. 29.10% of all households were made up of individuals, and 14.80% had someone living alone who was 65 years of age or older.  The average household size was 2.42 and the average family size was 2.98.

The county population contained 25.1% under the age of 18, 8.2% from 18 to 24, 25.7% from 25 to 44, 21.4% from 45 to 64, and 19.6% who were 65 years of age or older. The median age was 39 years. For every 100 females there were 97.00 males. For every 100 females age 18 and over, there were 93.60 males.

The median income for a household in the county was $36,654, and the median income for a family was $45,154. Males had a median income of $31,743 versus $23,317 for females. The per capita income for the county was $19,795.  About 6.3% of families and 9.2% of the population were below the poverty line, including 11.3% of those under age 18 and 5.6% of those age 65 or over.

2020 Census

Government
Mower County has a county-council style of government, made up of five county commissioners, each elected from a single-member district. They are elected to four-year terms, and elected on a staggered basis.

 First district cities: Brownsdale, Mapleview, Waltham and the 1st ward, 1st precinct of Austin
 Townships: Lansing Township, Red Rock Township, Udolpho Township, Waltham Township
 Commissioner: Tim Gabrielson
 Second district cities: Adams, Dexter, Elkton, Grand Meadow, Le Roy, Racine, Sargeant, Taopi
 Townships: Adams Township, Bennington Township, Clayton Township, Dexter Township, Frankford Township, Grand Meadow Township, Le Roy Township, Lodi Township, Marshall Township, Pleasant Valley Township, Racine Township, Sargeant Township
 Commissioner: Raymond Tucker
 Third district cities: Lyle, Rose Creek and the 2nd ward, 2nd precinct of Austin.
 Townships: Austin, Lyle, Nevada and Windom.
 Commissioner: Jerry Reinartz
 Fourth district: all of the 3rd ward of Austin.
 Commissioner: Jeff Baldus
 Fifth district: the 1st ward, 2nd precinct and the 2nd ward, 1st precinct of Austin.
 Commissioner: Mike Ankeny

From its first participating election in 1860 through 1928, Mower County was traditionally Republican, voting for the Republican nominee in every election save 1912, when it voted for Bull Moose nominee and former Republican president Theodore Roosevelt. After the New Deal realignment in 1932, Mower County leaned Democratic for about 80 years, voting for the Democrat in every presidential election through 2012 save in Eisenhower's two landslides (1952 and 1956), and 1960, when it voted for Nixon over Kennedy (despite having only narrowly voted for Eisenhower four years earlier). In 2016, Donald Trump became the first Republican to carry the county since 1960, winning a high plurality of 49.8%. In 2020, he carried it again, this time with a majority, making it the first time the county had voted Republican two elections in a row since 1956 and 1960.

Communities

Cities

 Adams
 Austin (county seat)
 Brownsdale
 Dexter
 Elkton
 Grand Meadow
 Le Roy
 Lyle
 Mapleview
 Racine
 Rose Creek
 Sargeant
 Taopi
 Waltham

Census-designated place
 Lansing

Unincorporated communities

 Andyville
 Corning (part)
 Johnsburg
 Mayville
 Nicolville
 Ramsey
 Renova
 Varco

Townships
Mower County's land is divided into 20 townships that each contain 36 square miles (six miles on a side). Mower County is five townships wide ( west to east) and four townships from north to south (24 miles).

 Adams
 Austin
 Bennington
 Clayton
 Dexter
 Frankford
 Grand Meadow
 Lansing
 Le Roy
 Lodi
 Lyle
 Marshall
 Nevada
 Pleasant Valley
 Racine
 Red Rock
 Sargeant
 Udolpho
 Waltham
 Windom

See also
 National Register of Historic Places listings in Mower County, Minnesota

References

Further reading

External links
 Mower County Official Page
 Mower County Genealogy
 Mower County Fair

 
Minnesota counties
1855 establishments in Minnesota Territory
Populated places established in 1855